John Joseph Del Isola (February 12, 1912 – October 23, 1986) was an American football offensive lineman for the New York Giants of the National Football League.

References

1912 births
1986 deaths
American football offensive linemen
Fordham Rams football players
New York Giants players
Sportspeople from Everett, Massachusetts